Highfields is a residential suburb of Newcastle, New South Wales, Australia, located  west-southwest of Newcastle's central business district near the Charlestown town centre. It is part of the City of Lake Macquarie local government area.

History 
The Aboriginal people, in this area, the Awabakal, were the first people of this land.

References

External links
 History of Highfields (Lake Macquarie City Library)

Suburbs of Lake Macquarie